Hawthorne James is an American character actor and director, known for his role as Big Red Davis in the 1991 film The Five Heartbeats.

He is also known for his role as Sam, the injured bus driver, in Speed and for films and television series such as Seven, NYPD Blue and guest-starring on Frasier as Bill in the season one episode "Miracle on Third or Fourth Street".

He was born James Hawthorne in Chicago, Illinois, the son of Robert Hawthorne and A. M. Alene. He earned a bachelor's degree in Theater from the University of Notre Dame, a master's degree from the University of Michigan, and taught Theater at Illinois State University.

James was responsible for his appearance in the funeral scene of Jimmy Potter in The Five Heartbeats, which he based on a scene Shakespeare's Richard III.

Selected filmography

 1979 Disco Godfather as Ray 'Stinger Ray' 
 1982 Penitentiary II as 1st Referee
 1985 The Color Purple as Jook Joint Patron
 1988 Patty Hearst as Tall Muslim
 1988 I'm Gonna Git You Sucka as Sam 'One Eyed Sam'
 1989 Ricky 1 as 'Silver Shadow', The Champ
 1989 Othello as Iago
 1991 The Doors as Chuck Vincent
 1991 The Five Heartbeats as 'Big Red'
 1992 Prophet Nat as Runaway Slave
 1993 Frasier (TV Series) as Bill
 1994 Caroline at Midnight as Stan Donovan
 1994 Speed as Sam
 1994 Martin (TV Series) as Brother Claus
 1995 Seven as George, The Night Guard At The Library
 1996 Heaven's Prisoners as Victor Romero
 1997 Campfire Tales as Cole (segment "The Honeymoon")
 1997 Amistad as Creole Cook
 1998 NYPD Blue (TV Series) as Calvin Chester
 1999 The Art of a Bullet as Walter Simmons
 2000 Auggie Rose as MacDougall
 2004 ER (TV Series) as Hawthorne
 2005 Boss'n Up as 'Orange Juice'
 2006 Hood of Horror as Liore
 2006 Stargate SG-1 (TV Series) as Gavos
 2006 The System Within as Hays
 2013 A Christmas Wedding as Arthur
 2015 Lucky Girl as Reverend Thompson
 2016 The Night Stalker as Harrison Johnson
 2016 Blues for Life as 'Plank Road Slim'

References

External links

Male actors from Chicago
American male film actors
African-American film directors
American film directors
American male television actors
African-American male actors
Living people
21st-century American male actors
20th-century American male actors
Year of birth missing (living people)
University of Michigan alumni
20th-century African-American people
21st-century African-American people